Fatima Cody Stanford is an American obesity medicine physician, internist, and pediatrician and an associate professor of medicine and pediatrics at Harvard Medical School. She is one of the most highly cited scientists in the field of obesity.

Early life and education 
Stanford was born and raised in Atlanta, Georgia, and she attended the Atlanta Public Schools where she was valedictorian of Benjamin E. Mays High School and finalist in the International Science and Engineering Fair. She received a Martin Luther King Scholarship to complete undergraduate studies at Emory University, and also completed a Master of Public Health degree at the same university. She is a Diamond Life Member of Delta Sigma Theta.

Stanford completed her medical training at the Medical College of Georgia, where she was the first black class president. She completed her medical residency at the University of South Carolina and her fellowship in obesity medicine at Massachusetts General Hospital and Harvard Medical School. She completed her Master of Public Administration at the Harvard Kennedy School of Government as a Zuckerman Fellow in the Center for Public Leadership and her Executive Master of Business Administration at Quantic School of Business and Technology.

Career 
She has served as the chair of the Minority Affairs Section (MAS) for the American Medical Association, chair of the American College of Physicians Obesity Advisory Committee, executive committee member of the American Academy of Pediatrics Section on Obesity, The Obesity Society Advocacy, Public Affairs, and Regulatory Board of Directors member, the American Board of Obesity Medicine Outreach and Awareness Committee, and the Massachusetts Chapter of the American Heart Association Board of Directors.

She is the director of diversity and inclusion for the Nutrition Obesity Research Center at Harvard (NORCH). Through the NIH, she serves as the director of the Nutrition Obesity Research Center (NORC) working group on workforce diversity.

Stanford's research focuses on the utilization of anti-obesity pharmacotherapy after bariatric surgery, outcomes and utility of adolescent bariatric surgery, pharmacotherapy for the treatment for obesity, physician and education and training in obesity care. She has also published work in COVID-19 disparities with Esther Duflo and Marcella Alsan.

Stanford has conducted interviews with the New York Times, USA Today, Time, U.S. News & World Report, Glamour, and NPR. On January 1, 2023, Stanford appeared on 60 Minutes with Lesley Stahl, stating obesity is a chronic genetic neurological disease and that there is physician bias against those with excess weight. She urged patients to “throw willpower out the window” since obesity is determined largely by genetics and weight “set point,” regardless of willpower, diet and exercise. 

She is a deputy editor for Contemporary Clinical Trials.

In 2018, Stanford said she was racially profiled when she administered medical assistance to a fellow passenger on a Delta Airlines flight. Flight attendants did not believe that she was a physician despite her presenting her medical license to them.

The United States Department of Health and Human Services and United States Department of Agriculture named Dr. Stanford to the 2025 Dietary Guidelines for Americans Advisory Committee as one of 20 nationally recognized nutrition and public health experts.

Books
 Facing Overweight and Obesity: A Complete Guide for Children and Adults with J.R. Stevens and T.A. Stern (Mass General Hospital Psychiatry Academy, February 4, 2019)
 Deja Review: Behavioral Sciences, 1st Edition (McGraw Hill, November 1, 2006)

Honors and awards 
1995: International Science and Engineering Fair Finalist
1996: Emory University Martin Luther King Jr. Scholar
2001: United States Congressional Award
2005: American Medical Association Foundation Leadership Award
2013: American College of Physicians Joseph E. Johnson Leadership Award
2013: National Institutes of Health Loan Repayment Program- Disparities
2014: Harvard University Zuckerman Fellow
2015: The Obesity Society Fellow
2016: National Minority Quality Forum Top 40 under 40 in Minority Health
2016: Massachusetts General Hospital Department of Medicine Sanchez and Ferguson Research Faculty Award
2017: Harvard Medical School Harold Amos Faculty Diversity Award
2017: Massachusetts Medical Society Women's Health Award
2017: Emory University Top 40 Under 40
2017: Massachusetts General Hospital Physician Scientist Development Award
2018: National Institutes of Health Loan Repayment Program- Clinical Research
2019: Massachusetts Medical Society Suffolk Community Clinician of the Year
2020: Massachusetts General Hospital Anne Klibanski Visiting Scholar Award
2020: The Obesity Society Clinician of the Year for Excellence in Clinical Management of Obesity
2021: American Medical Women's Association Fellow
2021: Massachusetts Medical Society Grant V. Rodkey Award for Outstanding Contributions to Medical Education
2021: Harvard Medical School Young Mentor Award
2021: Nutrition Obesity Research Center at Harvard Outstanding Manuscript Award
2021: Academy of Nutrition and Dietetics Friend of Weight Management Dietetic Practice Group Award
 2021: American Medical Association Pride of the Profession Award
 2021: Emory Rollins School of Public Health Distinguished Alumni Award
 2021: Nutrition Obesity Research Center at Harvard (NORCH) Mentoring for Diversity and Inclusion Award
 2022: Georgia Society of Endocrinology Dr. Anthony E. Karpas Memorial Lecture Award
 2022: National Academy of Medicine Scholar in Diagnostic Excellence 
 2023: Dietary Guidelines for Americans Advisory Committee

References 

Harvard Medical School faculty
Emory University alumni
Year of birth missing (living people)
Living people
Medical College of Georgia alumni
Harvard Kennedy School alumni
African-American physicians
21st-century African-American scientists
21st-century African-American women